is a Japanese manga series written and illustrated by Kei Sanbe. It was serialized in Kodansha's seinen manga magazine Evening from November 2019 to September 2021. The story is about a boy who switches bodies with a wanted criminal.

Plot
Minato Myojin, a fifth grader, takes care of his younger sister Nagisa, subsisting off the cash their single mother gives them when she sporadically comes home, while also being helped by Futaba, a high school girl. Tomohiro Takita, alias Kuromatsu, a professional criminal, committed a heist with three others—Nakabuchi, Nozaki, and Mutsuki—orchestrated by Tsubaki, and is wanted by the police and the Dōdōkai, a gang. On Nagisa's birthday, the children's mother takes them to an amusement park. While Minato and Nagisa ride a ferris wheel, it is struck by lightning, and Minato switches bodies with Kuromatsu, who has wrung Mutsuki's neck in another car.

Minato has to figure out how to get his body back while protecting Nagisa and evading Kuromatsu's pursuers.

Publication
Island in a Puddle, written and illustrated by Kei Sanbe, was serialized in Kodansha's seinen manga magazine Evening from November 26, 2019. to September 28, 2021. Kodansha collected its chapters in five tankōbon volumes, released from March 23, 2020, to November 22, 2021.

In June 2021, Kodansha USA announced the English release of the manga in North America, starting in 2022.

Volume list

References

Further reading

External links
  

Kodansha manga
Seinen manga
Suspense anime and manga